Wenger was a Swiss cutlery manufacturer that exists today as a line of once rival Victorinox, and a brand name for watches and licensed products owned by it. Founded in 1893, it was best known as one of two companies to manufacture Swiss Army knives. Based in Delémont, Wenger was acquired in 2005 by Victorinox and partially absorbed. Since 2013, Wenger Swiss Army knives are integrated in the Victorinox collection as the "Delémont collection".

History
The history of Wenger S.A. is strongly linked to the history of the Swiss Army knife.

Company origins
The industrial cutlery house of Paul Boechat & Cie (the future Wenger) was founded 1893 at Courtételle in the Delémont valley in the Canton of Jura.  It received a contract from the Swiss Army to produce knives as the second industrial cutlery manufacturer of Switzerland. In 1897 Theodore Wenger, a minister who had served in the US, was returning home to Switzerland and was hired by the group of entrepreneurs that had bought Boechat & Cie two years earlier (later renaming the company Wenger et Cie.). One of Wenger's first acts was to acquire a manufacturer of spoons and forks which he moved to a rented factory in Delémont.

In 1900, a new  facility was built. Both the utensil operations and the Courtételle cutlery production were incorporated into the new plant now called Fabrique Suisse de Coutellerie et Services. In 1908 the Swiss Army decided to split the contract, with half of the order going to Victorinox, in the German-speaking canton of Schwyz, and the other half to Wenger in the French-speaking part of the canton of Bern. In 1929, after Theo Wenger's death, Kaspar Oertli gained majority share in the company.

Between 1929 and 2005

In 1988, Wenger started producing watches, one year before Victorinox.

Crisis and restart
After the 9/11 attacks all air traveling and related industries were facing a severe crisis. This was also the case for the Swiss Army knife manufacturers especially Wenger S.A. Changing airport security regulations which precluded the carrying of pocket knives diminished the sales of Swiss Army knives at duty-free shops. The crisis led to the acquisition of Wenger by its competitor Victorinox in 2005.  With the backing of Victorinox, Wenger was able for a time to maintain its own production and branding of Swiss army knives and watches. Wenger knives had been advertised as the "Genuine Swiss Army Knife" and Victorinox as the "Original Swiss Army Knife".

Rebranding after acquisition
After being acquired by Victorinox, in 2005 Wenger S.A. started to develop new products. In the process of rebranding itself as a provider of multifunctional tools for outdoor adventures, Wenger started to cooperate with individuals such as Ueli Steck and Mike Horn acting as their brand ambassadors providing each of them with a suited multi-functional tool adapted to their specific challenges. Additionally Wenger cooperated with Alinghi providing the sailors with a suited multifunctional tool. Most recently Wenger supports the Patagonia Expedition Race.

Product lines merging
On January 30, 2013, Wenger and Victorinox announced that the separate knife brands were going to be merged into one brand: Victorinox. The press release stated that Wenger's factory in Delémont would continue to produce knives and all employees at this site will retain their jobs. They further elaborated that an assortment of items from the Wenger line-up will remain in production under the Victorinox brand name. Wenger's U.S. headquarters will be merged with Victorinox's location in Monroe, Connecticut. Wenger's watch and licensing business will continue as a separate brand.

Recent developments

On March, 2016, during the Baselworld 2016 expo, Victorinox relaunched the Wenger brand with marketing emphasising Swiss values at a reasonable price. Wenger changed its slogan to "A Swiss Company Since 1893" from "Maker of the genuine Swiss Army Knife", which was used for decades.

In 2017, Victorinox released a Swiss Army Knife model named “Wenger Red”. This knife has the Wenger logo and the Wenger brand name in the scale of the knife. This knife is delivered in a box with the Victorinox logo and brand name. This part number is produced in Delémont, Switzerland. This is the only Swiss Army Knife with the Wenger logo and brand name that is being produced and sold as today.

Products
The two main product lines of Wenger S.A. are the "Genuine Swiss Army Knife" and Wenger Watch. 
Additionally Wenger S.A. makes kitchen cutlery under the brand names of Swibo, Grand Maitre.

Genuine Swiss Army Knife
Most of the traditional products produced by Wenger are pocket knives with a body size of about 65 mm to 130 mm (2.5" to 5") and blades of about 50 mm to 100 mm (2" to 4") with features like can openers and screwdrivers in a red- or black-coloured case.

Special editions

The Giant

The Swiss Army knife is famous for integrating different tools into one knife. Wenger integrated 87 tools with 141 functions into one knife called The Giant, which was featured in Guinness World Records.

Heritage

Based on the original plans of the Swiss Army knife of 1908 Wenger introduced the limited edition line called Heritage.

TitaniumLine, Alinghi Sui 1, Mike Horn Knife & Patagonia Expedition Race

All three are multifunctional knives developed in cooperation with the individuals and organizations involved suited to their specific challenges. The Titanium Line is a product suited to the challenges a speed climber like Ueli Steck faces. For the Swiss Americas Cup participant Alinghi Wenger developed an easy to use knife for sailors. As the main sponsor of the Wenger Patagonia Expedition Race, Wenger created a knife suited to the challenges the participants of the race have to face.  For the adventurer Mike Horn Wenger released a knife in 2009.

Wenger Watches
Wenger Watches are made in Switzerland. The company's head office is located in Delémont Switzerland. Wenger watches are supposedly related to the basic ideas and concept of the Swiss Army Knife, having a multifunctional outdoor focus. Additionally Wenger produces several watches focusing only on elegance.

Other products
Wenger also makes notepads that can function as a twofold wallet.

Wenger produced bayonets for the Swiss Stgw 90 assault rifle. The bayonet has an overall length of 310 mm and a muzzle ring diameter of 22 mm. The 177 mm long blade is single-edged and it has no fuller. The bayonets were manufactured exclusively for the Swiss Army by Wenger and Victorinox (before the two companies merged).

In North America, licensed products using the Wenger and SwissGear trademarks are owned independently from Victorinox SA, and are used to market camping equipment (particularly tents, backpacks and sleeping bags), luggage, backpacks and office/business needs.

Gallery

See also
 Leatherman
 Gerber multitool
 Multi-tool

References

External links

Official global company website
Official US company website
Dedicated UK fan website
Wenger Backpacks

watch brands
Knife manufacturing companies
Multi-tool manufacturers
Victorinox
Watch brands
Manufacturing companies established in 1893
Swiss companies established in 1893
2005 mergers and acquisitions
Watch manufacturing companies of Switzerland
Tool manufacturing companies of Switzerland